Dagni is a rural locality (a selo) in Guriksky Selsoviet, Tabasaransky District, Republic of Dagestan, Russia. The population was 315 as of 2010. There are 3 streets.

Geography 
Dagni is located 10 km southwest of Khuchni (the district's administrative centre) by road. Gyugryag is the nearest rural locality.

References 

Rural localities in Tabasaransky District